Begna may refer to:

Places
Begna, Ethiopia, a village in the Oromia Region of Ethiopia
Begna, Norway, a village in Sør-Aurdal municipality in Innlandet county, Norway
Begna (river), a river in Innlandet county, Norway

See also
Begnas